Alexandru Cătălin Mica (born 25 August 1991), known as Alex Mica, is a Romanian dance/pop music singer.

Mica's song "Dalinda" placed on the Bulgaria Top 20 chart for three weeks in May–June 2012. For this song, he won Best New Act at that year's Romanian Music Awards.

References

1991 births
Living people
People from Timiș County
21st-century Romanian male singers
21st-century Romanian singers